Volver a Amar (English: To Love Again) is a 2014 Chilean telenovela produced and broadcast by TVN in 2014.

Cast 
 Adela Secall as María Paz Villaseñor
 César Sepúlveda as Luis Pizarro
 Felipe Braun as Franco Andrade
 Carmen Disa Gutiérrez as Carmen Véliz
 Erto Pantoja as Juvenal Pizarro
 Gloria Laso as Blanca Hernández
 Cecilia Cucurella as Aurora del Sante
 Marcela Osorio as Betsabé Tapia
 Gabriel Prieto as Salustio Corrales
 Ignacia Allamand as Olivia Thompson
 José Palma  as Pablo Errázuriz
 Marcela Medel as Rosa Peña
 Nathalia Aragonese as Nancy Corrales
 Cristián Chaparro as Víctor Núñez "Buho"
 Trinidad Gormaz as Martina Pizarro
 Carlos Briones as William Peña

See also
 Televisión Nacional de Chile

References

External links
 Official website 

2014 telenovelas
2014 Chilean television series debuts
2014 Chilean television series endings
Chilean telenovelas
Spanish-language telenovelas
Televisión Nacional de Chile telenovelas